Therdkiat Sitthepitak (born: August 29, 1970 in Buriram) is a retired Muay Thai fighter. He was a four time Lumpinee Stadium champion during the golden era of Muay Thai.

Biography and career

Somkid Crearone was born in the Buriram province where his father, a former fighter, initiated him to Muay Thai. He had his first fight at the of 14 under the name Kiatanrong Luksakaew before switching to Therdkiat Sitphonphitak. After a few years fighting in the provinces Therdkiat was scouted by Songchai Rattanasuban who brought him to Bangkok to compete for the Onesongchai promotion and gave him the ring name "Therdkiat Sitthepitak".

During the first part of his stadium career Therdkiat was training practically by himself in his native province, occasionally spending a short amount of time in a Bangkok camp before a fight. In 1992 he joined the Nongkeepahuyuth camp in Bangkok where he stayed for most of his stadium career, training alongside former opponents such as Namphon Nongkeepahuyuth and Namkabuan Nongkeepahuyuth.

Over the course of his career Therdkiat became a four time Lumpinee Stadium champion, first in the featherweight division and then three times at super-featherweight, earning the nickname "The King of Lumpinee". To win his titles he defeated champions of the golden era such as Superlek Sorn E-Sarn, Phetdam Lukborai or Oley Kiatoneway.

Titles and accomplishments
Lumpinee Stadium
 1989 Lumpinee Stadium 122 lbs Champion (1 defense)
 1990 Lumpinee Stadium 126 lbs Champion
 1991 Lumpinee Stadium 126 lbs Champion
 1993 Lumpinee Stadium 126 lbs Champion

International Muay Thai Council
 1997 IMTC Junior Welterweight champion

Fight record

|- style="background:#fbb;"
|  || Loss ||align=left| Brad Wright ||  || Perth, Australia || KO (Knee to the body) ||  ||
|- style="background:#cfc;"
| 2003-12-05 || Win ||align=left| Alex Ricci || King's Birthday Event || Sanam Luang, Thailand || Decision || 5 || 3:00
|- style="background:#cfc;"
| 2001-09-29 || Win ||align=left| Kanongsaklek K.T.Gym ||  || Bangkok, Thailand  || Decision || 5 || 3:00
|- style="background:#fbb;"
| 2000-09-09 || Loss ||align=left| Attachai Por.Samranchai || Lumpinee Stadium || Bangkok, Thailand  || Decision || 5 || 3:00
|- style="background:#fbb;"
| 1999-03-26 || Loss ||align=left| Attachai Por.Yosanan || Lumpinee Stadium || Bangkok, Thailand  || Decision || 5 || 3:00
|-
! style=background:white colspan=9 |
|- style="background:#fbb;"
| 1999-02-10 || Loss ||align=left| Kaolan Kaovichit || Rajadamnern Stadium || Bangkok, Thailand || Decision || 5||3:00
|- style="background:#fbb;"
| 1999-01-02 || Loss ||align=left| Orono Por Muang Ubon || Lumpinee Stadium || Bangkok, Thailand  || Decision || 5 || 3:00
|-  bgcolor="#fbb"
| 1997-10-05 || Loss||align=left| Morad Sari ||  ||  Paris, France ||TKO (Punches) ||3||
|- style="background:#cfc;"
| 1996- || Win ||align=left| Orono Por Muang Ubon || Lumpinee Stadium || Bangkok, Thailand  || Decision || 5 || 3:00
|- style="background:#cfc;"
| 1996-07-20 || Win ||align=left| Pairot Wor.Walapon ||  || Buriram Province, Thailand  || KO (Right Cross) || 3 ||
|- style="background:#fbb;"
| 1996-05-21 || Loss ||align=left| Kaoponglek Luksuratham || Lumpinee Stadium || Bangkok, Thailand || KO (Elbow) || 4 ||
|- style="background:#cfc;"
| 1996-03-05 || Win ||align=left| Samkor Kiatmontep || Lumpinee Stadium || Bangkok, Thailand || Decision || 5||3:00
|-  style="background:#cfc;"
| 1996-01-19 || Win ||align=left| Rainbow Sor.Prantalay || Lumpinee Stadium || Bangkok, Thailand || Decision || 5 ||3:00
|- style="background:#fbb;"
| 1995- || Loss ||align=left| Chatchai Paiseetong || Rajadamnern Stadium || Bangkok, Thailand  || Decision || 5 || 3:00
|- style="background:#fbb;"
| 1995-03-28 || Loss ||align=left| Pairot Wor.Wolapon || Lumpinee Stadium || Bangkok, Thailand  || Decision || 5 || 3:00
|- style="background:#cfc;"
| 1995-01-31 || Win ||align=left| Orono Por Muang Ubon || Lumpinee Stadium || Bangkok, Thailand  || Decision || 5 || 3:00
|- style="background:#c5d2ea;"
| 1994-11-29 || Draw ||align=left| Chatchai Paiseetong || Lumpinee Stadium || Bangkok, Thailand  || Decision || 5 || 3:00
|- style="background:#fbb;"
| 1994-07-29|| Loss ||align=left| Mathee Jadeepitak || Lumpinee Stadium || Bangkok, Thailand || TKO (Doctor Stoppage) ||4 ||
|-
! style=background:white colspan=9 |
|- style="background:#fbb;"
| 1994-06-20 || Loss ||align=left| Chatchai Paiseetong || Lumpinee Stadium || Bangkok, Thailand  || Decision || 5 || 3:00
|-  style="background:#cfc;"
| 1993-11-29 || Win ||align=left| Robert Kaennorasing || Rajadamnern Stadium || Bangkok, Thailand || Decision  || 5 || 3:00
|-  style="background:#cfc;"
| 1993-10-05 || Win ||align=left| Oley Kiatoneway || Lumpinee Stadium || Bangkok, Thailand || Decision (Majority) || 5 || 3:00
|-
! style=background:white colspan=9 |
|-  style="background:#fbb;"
| 1993-08-06 || Loss ||align=left| Oley Kiatoneway || Lumpinee Stadium || Bangkok, Thailand || KO (Punch) || 1 ||
|-  style="background:#fbb;"
| 1993-07-11|| Loss ||align=left| Jongsanan Fairtex ||  || Nakhon Sawan province, Thailand || Decision || 5 || 3:00
|-  style="background:#cfc;"
| 1993-03-23 || Win ||align=left| Chandet Sor Prantalay || Lumpinee Stadium || Bangkok, Thailand || Decision || 5 ||3:00
|-  style="background:#cfc;"
| 1993-02-26 || Win ||align=left| Robert Kaennorasing || Lumpinee Stadium || Bangkok, Thailand || Decision  || 5 || 3:00
|-  style="background:#cfc;"
| 1993-01-29|| Win ||align=left| Jongsanan Fairtex || Lumpinee Stadium || Bangkok, Thailand || KO (Right high kick)|| 2 ||
|-  style="background:#cfc;"
| 1992-11-20|| Win ||align=left| Nuathoranee Thongracha || Lumpinee Stadium || Bangkok, Thailand || Decision || 5 || 3:00
|-  style="background:#cfc;"
| 1992-10-13 || Win ||align=left| Cherry Sor Wanich || Lumpinee Stadium || Bangkok, Thailand || Decision || 5 || 3:00
|-  style="background:#fbb;"
| 1992-08-|| Loss ||align=left| Jongsanan Fairtex ||  || Australia || Decision || 5 || 3:00
|- style="background:#fbb;"
| 1992-06-09 || Loss ||align=left| Namkabuan Nongkeepahuyuth || Lumpinee Stadium || Bangkok, Thailand  || Decision || 5 || 3:00
|-  style="background:#cfc;"
| 1992-03-20 || Win ||align=left| Sangtiennoi Sor.Rungroj || Lumpinee Stadium || Bangkok, Thailand || Decision || 5 || 3:00
|-  style="background:#fbb;"
| 1992-02-21|| Loss ||align=left| Jongsanan Fairtex || Lumpinee Stadium || Bangkok, Thailand || Decision || 5 || 3:00
|-
! style=background:white colspan=9 |
|-  style="background:#cfc;"
| 1991-09-27 || Win ||align=left| Sanit Wichitkriangkrai || Lumpinee Stadium || Bangkok, Thailand || Decision || 5 || 3:00
|-
! style=background:white colspan=9 |
|-  style="background:#cfc;"
| 1991-07-20 || Win ||align=left| Jack Kiatniwat || Crocodile Farm || Samut Prakan, Thailand || Decision || 5 || 3:00
|-  style="background:#fbb;"
| 1991-06-14 || Loss ||align=left| Jaroenthong Kiatbanchong || Lumpinee Stadium || Bangkok, Thailand || Decision || 5 || 3:00
|-
! style=background:white colspan=9 |
|-  style="background:#fbb;"
| 1991-03-01 || Loss ||align=left| Namphon Nongkee Pahuyuth || Lumpinee Stadium || Bangkok, Thailand || KO || 4 ||
|-  style="background:#cfc;"
| 1991-02-15 || Win ||align=left| Rajasak Sor.Vorapin ||  || Phra Nakhon Si Ayutthaya, Thailand || Decision || 5 || 3:00
|-  style="background:#fbb;"
| 1990-12-20 || Loss ||align=left| Rajasak Sor.Vorapin || Rajadamnern Stadium || Bangkok, Thailand || Decision || 5 || 3:00
|-  style="background:#cfc;"
| 1990-11-27 || Win ||align=left| Jaroenthong Kiatbanchong || Lumpinee Stadium || Bangkok, Thailand || Decision || 5 || 3:00
|-  style="background:#fbb;"
| 1990-10-30 || Loss ||align=left| Cherry Sor Wanich || Lumpinee Stadium || Bangkok, Thailand || Decision || 5 || 3:00
|-  style="background:#cfc;"
| 1990-09-28 || Win ||align=left| Panomrunglek Chor.Sawat || Lumpinee Stadium || Bangkok, Thailand || Decision || 5 || 3:00
|-  style="background:#fbb;"
| 1990-08-31 || Loss ||align=left| Cherry Sor Wanich || Lumpinee Stadium || Bangkok, Thailand || Decision || 5 || 3:00
|-
! style=background:white colspan=9 |
|-  style="background:#cfc;"
| 1990-06-30 || Win ||align=left| Petchdam Lukborai || Lumpinee Stadium || Bangkok, Thailand || Decision || 5 || 3:00
|-
! style=background:white colspan=9 |
|-  style="background:#c5d2ea;"
| 1990-06-08 || Draw||align=left| Grandprinoi Muangchaiyaphum || Lumpinee Stadium || Bangkok, Thailand || Decision || 5 || 3:00
|-  style="background:#fbb;"
| 1990-04-24 || Loss ||align=left| Jaroenthong Kiatbanchong ||  Lumpinee Stadium  || Bangkok, Thailand || Decision || 5 || 3:00
|-  style="background:#cfc;"
| 1990-03-30 || Win ||align=left| Panomrunglek Chor.Sawat || Lumpinee Stadium || Bangkok, Thailand || Decision || 5 || 3:00
|-
! style=background:white colspan=9 |
|-  style="background:#cfc;"
| 1990-03- || Win ||align=left| Boonlong Sor.Thanikul || Lumpinee Stadium || Bangkok, Thailand || Decision || 5 || 3:00
|-  style="background:#cfc;"
| 1990-02-06 || Win ||align=left| Boonlong Sor.Thanikul || Lumpinee Stadium || Bangkok, Thailand || Decision || 5 || 3:00
|-  style="background:#cfc;"
| 1990-01- || Win ||align=left| Rot Lukrangsee || Lumpinee Stadium || Bangkok, Thailand || Decision || 5 || 3:00
|-  style="background:#fbb;"
| 1989-11-28 || Loss ||align=left| Panomrunglek Chor Sawat || Lumpinee Stadium || Bangkok, Thailand || Decision || 5 || 3:00
|-  style="background:#cfc;"
| 1989-11-07 || Win ||align=left| Superlek Sorn E-Sarn || Lumpinee Stadium || Bangkok, Thailand || Decision || 5 || 3:00
|-
! style=background:white colspan=9 |
|-  style="background:#cfc;"
| 1989-10-06 || Win ||align=left| Pon Narupai || Lumpinee Stadium || Bangkok, Thailand || Decision  || 5 || 3:00
|-  style="background:#cfc;"
| 1989- || Win ||align=left| Kaonar Sor Ketallingchan || Lumpinee Stadium || Bangkok, Thailand || Decision  || 5 || 3:00
|-  style="background:#cfc;"
| 1989-07-29 || Win ||align=left| Samransak Muangsurin || Sri Narong Stadium || Surin, Thailand || Decision  || 5 || 3:00
|-  style="background:#fbb;"
| 1989-06-24 || Loss ||align=left| Samransak Muangsurin || Lumpinee Stadium || Bangkok, Thailand || Decision  || 5 || 3:00
|-  style="background:#cfc;"
| 1989-04- || Win ||align=left| Den Muangsurin || Lumpinee Stadium || Bangkok, Thailand || Decision  || 5 || 3:00
|-  style="background:#cfc;"
| 1989-03-06 || Win ||align=left| Thammawit Saksamut || Rajadamnern Stadium || Bangkok, Thailand || Decision  || 5 || 3:00
|-  style="background:#cfc;"
| 1989-02- || Win ||align=left| Khunpon Chor Rojanachai || Lumpinee Stadium || Bangkok, Thailand || KO || 2 ||
|-  style="background:#cfc;"
| 1989-01-31 || Win ||align=left| Panomrunglek Chor Sawat || Lumpinee Stadium || Bangkok, Thailand || Referee Stoppage|| 4 ||
|-  style="background:#fbb;"
| 1989-01-06 || Loss ||align=left| Den Muangsurin || Lumpinee Stadium || Bangkok, Thailand || Decision  || 5 || 3:00
|-  style="background:#cfc;"
| 1988-11-25 || Win||align=left| Rittichai Lukjaomaesaithong || Lumpinee Stadium || Bangkok, Thailand || Decision  || 5 || 3:00
|-  style="background:#fbb;"
| 1988-11-04 || Loss||align=left| Panomrunglek Chor Sawat || Lumpinee Stadium || Bangkok, Thailand || Decision  || 5 || 3:00
|-  style="background:#cfc;"
| 1988-09-18 || Win||align=left| Kingdaeng Sor.Rattana ||  || Khon Kaen, Thailand || KO || 3||
|-  style="background:#cfc;"
| 1988-07-16 || Win||align=left| Dawuthai Chatchuphon || Lumpinee Stadium || Bangkok, Thailand || Decision || 5 || 3:00
|-  style="background:#cfc;"
| 1988- || Win||align=left| Kaenphet Saksam ||  || Thailand || KO || 3 ||
|-  style="background:#cfc;"
| 1988- || Win||align=left| Samingkhao Sor.Rattana ||  || Thailand || KO || 2 ||
|-  style="background:#cfc;"
| 1988- || Win||align=left| Kongnapa Kiatmongkol ||  || Thailand || KO || 2 ||
|-  style="background:#cfc;"
| 1987- || Win||align=left| Sinchai ||  || Roi Et, Thailand || Decision || 5 || 3:00
|-  style="background:#cfc;"
|  ||Win ||align=left| Yodkhunpon Sittraiphum ||  ||  Isan, Thailand  || Decision || 5 || 3:00
|-
! style=background:white colspan=9 |
|-
| colspan=9 | Legend:

References

1970 births
Living people
Therdkiat Sitthepitak
Muay Thai trainers
Therdkiat Sitthepitak